Gunyah is the fifteenth studio album by Australian country music artist John Williamson. The album was released in April 2002, peaked at number 20 on the ARIA Charts, and was certified gold.

The word "Gunyah" is an Australian Aboriginal word, meaning "small and temporary shelter".

Track listing

Charts

Weekly charts

Year-end charts

Certifications

Release history

References

2002 albums
John Williamson (singer) albums
EMI Records albums